In probability theory, Markov's inequality gives an upper bound for the probability that a non-negative function of a random variable is greater than or equal to some positive constant.  It is named after the Russian mathematician Andrey Markov, although it appeared earlier in the work of Pafnuty Chebyshev (Markov's teacher), and many sources, especially in analysis, refer to it as Chebyshev's inequality (sometimes, calling it the first Chebyshev inequality, while referring to Chebyshev's inequality as the second Chebyshev inequality) or Bienaymé's inequality.

Markov's inequality (and other similar inequalities) relate probabilities to expectations, and provide (frequently loose but still useful) bounds for the cumulative distribution function of a random variable.

Statement
that  is at least  is at most the expectation of  divided by :

Let  (where ); then we can rewrite the previous inequality as

This measure-theoretic definition is sometimes referred to as Chebyshev's inequality.

Extended version for nondecreasing functions

An immediate corollary, using higher moments of  supported on values larger than 0, is

Proofs
We separate the case in which the measure space is a probability space from the more general case because the probability case is more accessible for the general reader.

Intuition

Probability-theoretic proof
Method 1:
From the definition of expectation: 

However, X is a non-negative random variable thus,  

From this we can derive, 

From here, dividing through by  allows us to see that 

Method 2:

Using this notation, we have  if the event  occurs, and  if .  Then, given ,

If , then , and so .

Since  is a monotonically increasing function, taking expectation of both sides of an inequality cannot reverse it. Therefore,

Now, using linearity of expectations, the left side of this inequality is the same as

Thus we have

and since a > 0, we can divide both sides by a.

Measure-theoretic proof
We may assume that the function  is non-negative, since only its absolute value enters in the equation. Now, consider the real-valued function s on X given by

Then . By the definition of the Lebesgue integral

Corollaries

Chebyshev's inequality 
Chebyshev's inequality uses the variance to bound the probability that a random variable deviates far from the mean. Specifically, 

for any . Here  is the variance of X, defined as:

Chebyshev's inequality follows from Markov's inequality by considering the random variable

 

and the constant  for which Markov's inequality reads

 

This argument can be summarized (where "MI" indicates use of Markov's inequality):

Other corollaries
The "monotonic" result can be demonstrated by:

The result that, for a nonnegative random variable ,  the quantile function of  satisfies:

the proof using

Then

can be shown in a similar manner.

Examples
Assuming no income is negative, Markov's inequality shows that no more than 1/5 of the population can have more than 5 times the average income.

See also
 Paley–Zygmund inequality – a corresponding lower bound 
 Concentration inequality – a summary of tail-bounds on random variables.

References

External links
The formal proof of Markov's inequality in the Mizar system.

Probabilistic inequalities
Articles containing proofs